Ajdin Hrustic (born 5 July 1996) is an Australian professional footballer who plays as an attacking midfielder for Serie A club Hellas Verona and the  Australia national team.

Early life
Born in Dandenong, Victoria Hrustic played youth football with South Melbourne and Schalke 04 before moving to FC Groningen, where he made his professional debut in 2017. In 2020 he signed for the German football club Eintracht Frankfurt.

Club career

Groningen
In June 2015, Hrustic signed a three-year contract with FC Groningen, his first senior professional deal. He made his competitive debut for the club as a substitute in a draw against AZ Alkmaar on 2 April 2017. His first goal for the club came two weeks later, with a shot from long range to seal a 5–1 win over PEC Zwolle.

Eintracht Frankfurt
On 28 September 2020, Hrustic signed a contract with German Bundesliga side Eintracht Frankfurt that will keep him at the club through to 2023, and was given the No. 7 jersey. He made his debut on 19 December 2020 in a 2–0 victory against FC Augsburg, coming off the bench for Aymen Barkok.

Hrustic scored his first goal for Eintracht Frankfurt against Mainz 05, on 9 May 2021, with an improvised finish where he managed to chip the ball over goalkeeper Robin Zentner.

On 18 May 2022, Hrustic became the first Australian player to win the UEFA Europa League in its history, after Eintracht Frankfurt triumphed over Scottish opponent Rangers in the 2022 final, winning a penalty shootout 5–4 after the match ended 1-1 after extra time, with Hrustic converting his team's second penalty of the shootout. He became the first Australian since Harry Kewell in 2005 to win a major UEFA competition.

Hellas Verona
On 1 September 2022, Hrustic signed a four-year contract with Hellas Verona in Italy.

International career  

Due to his Bosnian and Romanian heritage, Hrustic was eligible to represent Bosnia and Herzegovina and Romania internationally. He was contacted by the Football Association of Bosnia and Herzegovina in May 2017, but ultimately rejected the offer and expressed his wish to represent the Socceroos.

Hrustic was called up to an Australian under-23 development squad in March 2017. This was the first time Hrustic had been involved with Football Federation Australia in several years, having previously not been involved with the Australian setup since moving to Europe.

On 22 May 2017, Hrustic was named in the Australian national side's 30-man preliminary squad for the month of June, including the 2017 FIFA Confederations Cup, a friendly against Brazil and a 2018 FIFA World Cup qualifier against Saudi Arabia. He was retained in the final 23-man squad. He made his Socceroos debut on the losing side of a 4–0 friendly against Brazil, coming on as a 57th-minute substitute.

On 4 June 2021, Hrustic scored his first goal for Australia against Kuwait in a 2022 FIFA World Cup qualifying match, bending the ball off the inside of the post and in from a 30-odd-metre free-kick. His second goal also came off a free-kick bouncing off the crossbar to go in underneath the goal against Japan in 2021.

Personal life 
Hrustic was born in Dandenong a suburb of Melbourne, Australia to a Bosnian father and a Romanian mother.

Career statistics

Club

International

Scores and results list Australia's goal tally first, score column indicates score after each Hrustic goal.

Honours
Eintracht Frankfurt
UEFA Europa League: 2021–22

See also
List of foreign football players in the Netherlands

References

External links

 
 
 

1996 births
Living people
Association football midfielders
FC Groningen players
Eintracht Frankfurt players
Hellas Verona F.C. players
Eredivisie players
Derde Divisie players
Bundesliga players
UEFA Europa League winning players
Australian people of Bosnia and Herzegovina descent
Australian people of Romanian descent
Soccer players from Melbourne
Australian expatriate soccer players
Expatriate footballers in the Netherlands
Australian expatriate sportspeople in the Netherlands
Expatriate footballers in Germany
Australian expatriate sportspeople in Germany
Expatriate footballers in Italy
Australian expatriate sportspeople in Italy
Australian expatriate sportspeople in England
2017 FIFA Confederations Cup players
Australian people of Bosniak descent
Australian soccer players
Australia international soccer players
2022 FIFA World Cup players
People from Dandenong, Victoria